Mitogen-activated protein kinase kinase kinase kinase 2 is an enzyme that in humans is encoded by the MAP4K2 gene.

Function 

The protein encoded by this gene is a member of the serine/threonine protein kinase family. Although this kinase is found in many tissues, its expression in lymphoid follicles is restricted to the cells of germinal centre, where it may participate in B-cell differentiation. This kinase can be activated by TNF-alpha, and has been shown to specifically activate MAP kinases. This kinase is also found to interact with TNF receptor-associated factor 2 (TRAF2), which is involved in the activation of MAP3K1/MEKK1. A recent study showed that MAP4K2 is a direct kinase of LATS1/2 and thus regulates the Hippo pathway effectors YAP and TAZ.

Interactions 

MAP4K2 has been shown to interact with RAB8A and TRAF2.

References

Further reading